George Wilder may refer to:

George Wilder (cricketer) (1876–1948), English athlete
George Wilder (criminal), New Zealand prison escaper and folk hero
George H. Wilder, former speaker of the Florida House of Representatives
George Wilder Mitchell (1904–1997), American economist